Mancho is a summit in the eastern part of the Rila Mountain in southwestern Bulgaria reaching height of 2,771 m. It is a granite bifurcated peak, with the higher section located to the southwest and the lower one to the northeast. Its western, northern and eastern slopes are steep and difficult to access. The northwestern slope forms the walls of the Maritsa cirque which contains the Marichini Lakes. On its slopes grows the endangered plant Taraxacum bithynicum.

Citations

References 
 
 

Mountains of Rila
Landforms of Sofia Province
Two-thousanders of Bulgaria